Stephen Cain (born 1970) is a Canadian poet and academic.

In his five books of poetry Cain demonstrates an interest in various poetic forms including sound poetry and concrete poetry, as well as constraint-based writing and procedural poetics. Avant-garde movements, such as Language Poetry and Oulipo, appear to be influences on his writing and his work is marked by frequent use of alliteration, pun, and disjunction. In content, his poetry often mixes pop culture with literary theory and political concerns.

He has been involved with various editorial activities including being a literary editor at the journal Queen Street Quarterly, and a fiction editor at Insomniac Press.

Cain’s critical work focuses on the small press and experimental poetry, including the Canadian  writer bpNichol. A collection of Nichol's early long poems was compiled and edited by Cain in 2014. With Tim Conley, he co-authored an Encyclopedia of Fictional and Fantastic Languages (2006).

He lives in Toronto where he teaches at York University.

Bibliography

Poetry
dyslexicon (1998) Coach House Books
Torontology (2001) ECW Press
American Standard/ Canada Dry (2005) Coach House Books
I Can Say Interpellation (2011) Book*hug
False Friends (2017) Book*hug

Fiction
Double Helix (with Jay MillAr) (2006)The Mercury Press

Non-fiction
Encyclopedia of Fictional and Fantastic Languages (with Tim Conley) (2006) Greenwood Publishing Group

Editor
bp:beginnings The Early Long Poems & Sequences of bpNichol (2014) Book*hug

1970 births
Living people
20th-century Canadian poets
20th-century Canadian male writers
Canadian male poets
21st-century Canadian poets
Writers from Toronto
Academic staff of York University
21st-century Canadian male writers